Ilene Busch-Vishniac is an American-born mechanical engineer and university administrator. She served as Dean of the Whiting School of Engineering at Johns Hopkins University from 1998 to 2003 then resigned the position to serve as President of the Acoustical Society of America (ASA), an elected non-gratis position, from 2003 to 2005. She served as Provost and Vice-President for Academic Affairs at McMaster University from 2007 to 2012, and as President of the University of Saskatchewan from 2012 to 2014. In 2018 she joined startup Sonavi Labs as Chief Innovation Officer. She has written research papers for the ASME on matters related to tribology.

Busch-Vishniac received her bachelor's degree in physics and mathematics (magna cum laude) from the University of Rochester in 1976. She then received her master's degree in 1978 and her PhD in 1981, both in mechanical engineering from the Massachusetts Institute of Technology.

University of Saskatchewan 
In December 2011, Busch-Vishniac was selected as the ninth President of the University of Saskatchewan, replacing Peter MacKinnon with effect from July 2012. On May 21, 2014, she was "terminated without cause" from her position amid national criticism surrounding the Provost's decision, Brett Fairbairn, to dismiss and end the tenure of an executive director who had openly criticized the university's leadership while Busch-Vishniac was away. Busch-Vishniac criticized the decision the next day, and invited the former executive director to return as a professor. In June, 2015, Busch-Vishniac filed a lawsuit over her firing seeking $8.5 million in damages, naming Saskatchewan Premier, Brad Wall, former Minister of Advanced Education, Rob Norris, as well as the university and Board of Governors and alleging that both the Premier and former Minister unlawfully influenced the Board's decision in her firing. The University is also accused of violating its bylaws when it terminated her contract. In 2019, after an attempt to dismiss the lawsuit, the University and Dr. Busch-Vishniac settled out of court.

Awards and honors
Busch-Vishniac received the ASA Silver Medal in Engineering Acoustics in 2001 for her work in developing novel electret microphones and of precision micro-electro-mechanical sensors and positioners. She was elected a Fellow of the Acoustical Society of America (ASA) in 1987, and also received the ASA R. Bruce Lindsay Award.

References 

Academic staff of McMaster University
Presidents of the University of Saskatchewan
Living people
Academics in Saskatchewan
Educators from Philadelphia
People from Saskatoon
Johns Hopkins University faculty
University of Rochester alumni
MIT School of Engineering alumni
Fellows of the Acoustical Society of America
Year of birth missing (living people)
American women academics
21st-century American women